The Special Goodness is an American alternative rock band from Los Angeles, California, formed in 1996 by Weezer drummer Patrick Wilson. The band's line-up has included Atom Willard (drums), Weezer bassists Mikey Welsh and Scott Shriner, Pat Finn, Jeb Lewis, Lee Loretta, and Murphy Karges. The band's name comes from a description of how Wilson apparently feels when he creates music.

In May 2012, Wilson released the project's fourth studio album, Natural.

Releases
The band has released four albums, Special Goodness (aka "The Bunny Record," recorded in 1996 for, and shelved by Geffen Records, re-packaged and re-released during tours in 1999 and 2000 and given a full Japan-only release in 1998), At Some Point, Birds and Flowers Became Interesting (2001, self-released and also known as "Pinecone"), Land Air Sea (2003) and Natural (2012). After being signed to Epitaph Records in mid-2003 the band re-released a remixed and re-ordered version of Land Air Sea. Their song "Life Goes By" was featured on Punk-O-Rama Vol. 9 and an unreleased track "Not The Way" was featured on Punk-O-Rama Vol. 10. They released music videos for both "N.F.A" and "Life Goes By" from Land Air Sea, the latter being directed by weezer.com webmaster Karl Koch.

On the road
The Special Goodness began touring together in 1999. The Special Goodness was the first side-project/spin-off from Weezer (such as Space Twins, The Rentals and Homie) to ever actually open for Weezer, which they did on the band's 2002 Enlightenment Tour as Wilson minded both the duties as frontman for The Special Goodness and as drummer for Weezer. The Relationship, Brian Bell's band, would later open for Weezer on the 2008 Troublemaker Tour.

Other notable tours include a west coast tour with fellow Weezer side-project The Space Twins in 1999 and opening for the Foo Fighters in 2003, a feat that Wilson would repeat in 2005 whilst playing with Weezer.

One of their most notable shows was on November 2, 1999 at Club Laga in Pittsburgh. The club's promoter billed the gig as "The Special Goodness playing all the Weezer Hits." The band played through their set of Special Goodness songs, but felt as if they had to live up to the bill, so an encore of "Tired of Sex" and "Undone - The Sweater Song" was played.

Writing and release of fourth album
TSG's fourth album got off to a quick start in early 2005 while Weezer's fifth album, Make Believe, was waiting to be mixed and released. Wilson, along with Scott Shriner on bass and Willard on drums, recorded a full album at The Steakhouse Studio in the San Fernando Valley with Joe Barresi engineering the sessions. Overdubbing, mixing and mastering for the album had been completed and Wilson had a tentative track list for the album, which consisted of many songs that he had written for possible inclusion in Weezer's fifth album. Yet in a January 26, 2006, post on thespecialgoodness.com, Wilson stated "In my opinion, the songs weren't very good. The lyrics, melodies, chords and playing were strong but these do not add up to compelling songs." He also claimed that "a year of playing to large audiences (with Weezer) I've begun to understand what I truly value about playing and writing. More to come." Weezer.com webmaster Karl Koch has attributed the album's non-release to "concerns of commercial viability".

Wilson cleared speculation by updating The Special Goodness website on July 12, 2006, stating that "3 songs and more on the way" and on August 13, 2006 stating "Ideally, I'd like to release something in the spring but I will sell no wine before its time." On February 15, 2007, Wilson posted on the site "Lots of new songs have been written and I think an album will be released this year."

In mid-November 2007, the following was posted on the TSG website: "Baby coming! Potentially earlier  anticipated, therefore recording session rescheduled for February/March."

Throughout 2008, the TSG community was very quiet.  On June 26, 2008, Wilson had to undergo knee surgery. Then, in late 2008, he toured with Weezer in support of their self-titled 2008 release. Even though songs for another release were constructed, a close album release did not happen.

A fan messaged Atom Willard via Modlife, and he stated that there were no plans for any new music. He also said that Wilson had moved away, making it difficult to meet up.

On January 5, 2011, an update was posted on The Special Goodness website revealing that a new album had been recorded with Wilson as the sole performer and was in the mixing stages: "Very pleased to announce a new TSG album, it’s currently being mixed, has 10 songs, a guitar, a bass, drums and vocals."
In April 2012, an update was posted on The Special Goodness website where fans could listen to samples of songs from the album, Natural, with a release date set in May. It was made available for streaming in its entirety on Spinner.com on Monday, May 14, 2012.

Discography
 Special Goodness (1998)
 At Some Point, Birds and Flowers Became Interesting (2001)
 Land Air Sea (2003)
 Natural (2012)

References

External links
 Special Goodness website
 MTV’s artist page for The Special Goodness
 [ The Special Goodness] at Allmusic
 Interview with Pat, about TSG, at Independent Music Online

Alternative rock groups from California
Musical groups from Los Angeles
Musical groups established in 1996